Kanduleh may refer to:
 Kanduleh, Sahneh
 Kanduleh Rural District, in Sahneh County